Stephen II of Amasea, (died 19 July 928) was the Ecumenical Patriarch of Constantinople from 29 June 925 to 18 July 928. He appears to have been appointed to the post by Romanos I Lekapenos after the death of Nicholas I as a stop-gap until Romanos's own son, Theophylact, was old enough to assume the post. Steven Runciman calls him a "deliberate nonentity". He is a saint, commemorated on July 18.

References

928 deaths
10th-century patriarchs of Constantinople
People from Amasya
Year of birth unknown